Motorway Cops is a British documentary series broadcast on BBC One which follows Road Policing Units from various UK police forces.

Concept
The show follows the day-to-day role of traffic officers and the incidents they come across. The majority of filming takes place at the scene of incidents, with occasional cuts to police stations and interview rooms. Locations include Yorkshire, Cheshire, Humberside and the West Midlands.

Series 1 followed Central Motorway Police Group, Cheshire Constabulary and Humberside Police, series 2, 3 and 4 followed Central Motorway Police Group, series 5 followed Central Motorway Police Group, West Yorkshire Police and Yorkshire and the Humber Regional Roads Crime Team, series 6 and 7 followed West Yorkshire Police.

Production 
Motorway Cops, along with its sister series Traffic Cops, are produced by Folio Productions, a subsidiary of Mentorn Media. Both shows were broadcast on the BBC until 2016. Jamie Theakston narrated all seven series of Motorway Cops. On 28 June 2016, Mentorn Media announced that Traffic Cops had been recommissioned by Channel 5, however there was no mention of Motorway Cops.

Episodes

Series overview

Series 1 (2008–10)

Series 2 (2010–11)

Series 3 (2011–12)

Series 4 (2013)

Series 5 (2013–14)

Series 6 (2014–15)

Series 7 (2015)

See also
 Traffic Cops - sister series broadcast on Channel 5.
 Sky Cops - sister series broadcast on BBC One.
 Police Interceptors - series broadcast on Channel 5 with a similar format.
 Brit Cops - police documentary series originally on Bravo and now on Sky Livingit.
 Road Wars - programme broadcast on Sky1, Sky2, and Pick TV which is about Road Traffic Police.
 Street Wars - programme broadcast on Sky about police officers "on the beat".
 Police Camera Action! - series broadcast on ITV with a similar format.

References

External links 

2008 British television series debuts
2015 British television series endings
2010s British television series
BBC television documentaries
British crime television series
British reality television series
Documentary television series about policing
Television shows set in the United Kingdom